Garth Hill College (also Garth Hill and Garth) is a coeducational secondary school and sixth form located in Bracknell, Berkshire, England.

It was created as Garth Hill School (a Comprehensive) in September 1969 from an amalgamation of Wick Hill Secondary Modern School (opened 1956) and neighbouring Garth Grammar School (opened 1965), the name of the latter referring to a former local fox hunt. The school underwent a £40 million rebuild in 2010, and was opened in September of the same year. However, it wasn't officially opened by Princess Anne until March 10, 2011. The school has recently gained yet another new building for the sixth form of Garth Hill, costing £6 million and opened in 2015 by the Mayor of Bracknell.

Notable students

 Melissa Fletcher, Welsh national footballer
 David Thorpe (motorcyclist), former professional motocross racer and racing team manager
 Ady Williams, former Wales international footballer and former football manager

References

External links
Official school website
Ofsted reports

Secondary schools in Bracknell Forest
Educational institutions established in 1956
Community schools in Bracknell Forest
1956 establishments in England